Kijfhoek is a small village in the Dutch province of South Holland. It is located about 4 km west of the town of Zwijndrecht.

Kijfhoek was a separate municipality between 1817 and 1857, when it merged with Groote Lindt.

North of Kijfhoek lies one of the largest railway yards of the Netherlands.

References

Populated places in South Holland
Former municipalities of South Holland
Zwijndrecht, Netherlands
1817 establishments in the Netherlands